George White also known as Chalky White (1931-2017) was a speedway rider from England.

Speedway career 
White reached the final of the Speedway World Championship on two occasions in the 1957 Individual Speedway World Championship and the 1959 Individual Speedway World Championship.

He rode in the top tier of British Speedway from 1957-1961, riding primarily for Swindon Robins.

World final appearances

Individual World Championship
 1957 -  London, Wembley Stadium - 13th - 4pts
 1959 -  London, Wembley Stadium - 9th - 7pts

World Team Cup
 1960* -  Göteborg, Ullevi (with Peter Craven / Ron How / Ken McKinlay / Nigel Boocock) - 2nd - 30pts (6)
* 1960 for England.

References 

1931 births
2017 deaths
British speedway riders
Swindon Robins riders
Yarmouth Bloaters riders